Elliott Erwitt (born Elio Romano Erwitt, July 26, 1928) is a French-born American advertising and documentary photographer known for his black and white candid photos of ironic and absurd situations within everyday settings. He has been a member of Magnum Photos since 1953.

Early life 

Erwitt was born in Paris, France, to Jewish-Russian immigrant parents, who soon moved to Italy. In 1939, when he was ten, his family migrated to the United States. He studied photography and filmmaking at Los Angeles City College and the New School for Social Research, finishing his education in 1950. In 1951 he was drafted into the Army, and discharged in 1953.

Photography career 

Erwitt served as a photographer's assistant in the 1950s in the United States Army while stationed in France and Germany. He was influenced by meeting the famous photographers Edward Steichen, Robert Capa and Roy Stryker.  Stryker, the former Director of the Farm Security Administration's photography department, hired Erwitt to work on a photography project for the Standard Oil Company. He then began a freelance photographer career and produced work for Collier's, Look, Life and Holiday. Erwitt was invited to become a member of Magnum Photos by the founder Robert Capa.

One of the subjects Erwitt has frequently photographed in his career is dogs: they have been the subject of five of his books, Son of Bitch (1974), To the Dogs (1992), Dog Dogs (1998), Woof (2005), and Elliott Erwitt's Dogs (2008).

Erwitt has created an alter ego, the beret-wearing and pretentious "André S. Solidor" (which abbreviates to "ass") — "a contemporary artist, from one of the French colonies in the Caribbean, I forget which one" — to "satirise the kooky excesses of contemporary photography." His work was published in a book, The Art of André S. Solidor (2009), and exhibited in 2011 at the Paul Smith Gallery in London.

Erwitt was awarded the Royal Photographic Society's Centenary Medal and an honorary fellowship (HonFRPS) in 2002 in recognition of a sustained, significant contribution to the art of photography. and the International Center for Photography's Infinity Award, Lifetime Achievement category, in 2011.

Filmmaking career 
Since the 1970s, he has devoted much of his energy toward movies. His feature films, television commercials, and documentary films include Arthur Penn: the Director (1970), Beauty Knows No Pain (1971), Red, White and Bluegrass (1973) and the prize-winning Glassmakers of Herat, Afghanistan (1977). He was, as well, credited as camera operator for Gimme Shelter (1970), still photographer for Bob Dylan: No Direction Home (2005), and provided addition photography for Get Yer Ya Ya's Out (2009).

A collection of Erwitt's films were screened in 2011 as part of the DocNYC Festival's special event "An Evening with Elliott Erwitt".

Exhibitions 
Elliott Erwitt: Personal Best, International Center of Photography, New York, 2011
Elliott Erwitt, Black & White and Kolor, A Gallery for Fine Photography, New Orleans, 2011
Elliott Erwitt: Home Around The World, Harry Ransom Center, The University of Texas at Austin, 2016–2017
Elliott Erwitt: Pittsburgh 1950, International Center of Photography, New York, 2018

Iconic photographs 
 USA, New York City, 1946 – Street-level shot comparing the size of a woman's feet to a chihuahua wearing a sweater.
 USA, North Carolina, Segregated Water Fountains, 1950.
 USA, New York City, 1953 – Image of Erwitt's wife looking at their baby on a bed lit by window light.
 USA, NYC, Felix, Gladys, and Rover, 1974 – Image of a woman's booted feet between that of a Great Dane's legs and a little chihuahua.
 USSR, Russia, Moscow, Nikita Khrushchev and Richard Nixon, 1959 – Powerful Cold War image in which Nixon is poking his index finger at Khrushchev's suit lapel.
 USA, California, 1955 – Image of a side-view mirror of an automobile parked facing a beach sunset, with a playful couple shown in the mirror as the focal point.

Collection
 Harry Ransom Center, Austin, TX
 International Center of Photography, New York, NY
 Jackson Fine Art, Atlanta, GA
 Met Museum, New York, NY
 International Photography Hall of Fame, St.Louis, MO

Books
 1972 – Photographs and Anti-Photographs 
 1972 – Observations on American Architecture 
 1974 – Elliott Erwitt: The Private Experience (In the series "Masters of Contemporary Photography", text by Sean Callahan.) Los Angeles: Petersen. Sean Callahan describes and to some extent explains Erwitt's work.  
 1974 – Son of Bitch, photographs of dogs 
 1978 – Recent Developments 
 1988 – Personal Exposures 
 1991 – On the Beach 
 1992 – To The Dogs 
 1993 – The Angel Tree
 1994 – Between the Sexes 
 1997 – 100+1 Elliott Erwitt 
 1998 – Dog Dogs A collection of black and white photographs of dogs Erwitt was intrigued by throughout his world travels.
 1999 – Museum Watching 
 2001 – Snaps. London & New York: Phaidon. A large anthology (over 500 pages) of Erwitt's work.  
 2002 – EE 60/60 
 2002 – Elliott Erwitt's Handbook 
 2005 – Woof 
 2009 – Elliott Erwitt's Rome. teNeues Publishing 
 2009 – Elliott Erwitt's New York 
 2010 – The Art of Andre S. Solidor aka Elliott Erwitt 
 2010 – Elliott Erwitt Personal Best 
 2011 – Elliott Erwitt, Sequentially Yours 
 2012 – Elliott Erwitt XXL – Special and Collectors Edition 
 2013 – Elliott Erwitt's Kolor Kempen, Germany: teNeues .
 2017 – Pittsburgh 1950 London. Gost. With an essay by Vaughn Wallace. Photographs made in Pittsburgh for Pittsburgh Photographic Library. 
 2018 – Elliot Erwitt's Scotland. teNeues Publishing Company 
 2021 – Found, Not Lost. London. Gost.

Philanthropy
In October 2020, Erwitt partnered with the digital collectible cards company Phil Ropy and created a card to raise awareness for Project HOPE's COVID-19 response. The picture on the card shows a pair of medical rubber gloves as a reminder of how exposed health care workers are and as an allusion to Project HOPE's logo. The proceeds from the sales of the card are redistributed to the organization.

References

External links
  (requires Flash)
 Magnum Photos portfolio
 Robert Koch Gallery portfolio
  "Elliott Erwitt at the Museo di Roma", Financial Times (London), November 20 2009
 Peter Conrad, "Elliott Erwitt's law of intended consequences", The Observer, 20 February 2011
 New York Times article about the exhibition May to August at the ICP, New York City
 Encyclopædia Britannica
 Elliott Erwitt's Personal Best eBook, 2011 
 Elliott Erwitt's print archive is placed at the Harry Ransom Center at The University of Texas at Austin
 PDNB Gallery, Dallas, Texas

1928 births
Living people
Magnum photographers
American portrait photographers
French emigrants to the United States
French people of Russian-Jewish descent
The New School alumni
Los Angeles City College alumni
American people of French-Jewish descent
American photojournalists
French photojournalists
Photography in Italy